Burnt village is a painting by Finnish painter Albert Edelfelt completed in 1879.

The painting depicts an imaginary scene from the time of the Cudgel War of 1596–1597, a peasant uprising in Finland, which was then part of the Kingdom of Sweden. In the painting, a Finnish peasant family has fled their home village, which has been burnt down by a military force. The creator Albert Edelfelt donated the painting to Cygnaeus Gallery in Helsinki, Finland where it is on display. Edelfelt also made a study for the painting in 1878–79.

Study

References 

1879 paintings
Paintings by Albert Edelfelt
Paintings in the collection of the Ateneum
Paintings of people